Sana Canté is a Guinean jurist and activist. He chaired the Vigilant Non-Compliant Citizen's Movement over the years of the political and parliamentary crisis and was one of the most critical voices to the presidency of José Mário Vaz.

References 

Bissau-Guinean activists
Living people
Year of birth missing (living people)
Bissau-Guinean lawyers